Kate Saxon is a British freelance theatre, TV and games director who lives in London. She was Associate Director of Shared Experience theatre company from 2000–2012 and is currently an Associate Artist of the company.

Theatre 
Saxon directed Phil Daniels in David Edgar's "Jekyll and Hyde" in 2018 and was director of the successful 2015 production of Alan Bennett's The History Boys for Sell A Door Theatre Company national UK tour. The Times gave 4 stars, stating: "Saxon definitely handles the shifts from the intimate and intellectual to the riotous." 
Saxon's productions include Tom Stoppard's The Real Thing which toured nationally in 2012 and The Years Between in 2011, for which her leading actress, Marianne Oldham, was nominated for Best Performer at the British Theatre Awards. Also the premiere of Mark Healy's adaptation of Thomas Hardy's Far From the Madding Crowd (UK 2008), for English Touring Theatre and of John Fowles' The French Lieutenant's Woman for its world premiere in the USA and later British premiere.

For the Orange Tree Theatre's Susan Glaspell season she staged the first revival of Glaspell's 1922 comedy Chains of Dew in March 2008.

International productions include Nine Parts of Desire, at The Public, New York and later at The Wilma, Philadelphia. The production was the winner of two Barrymore Awards.

Saxon was Associate Director of the West End run and the international tour of Polly Teale's After Mrs. Rochester.

Game directing
Saxon is a cinematic performance capture and voice director. She directed the Cinematics for Hangar 13's "Mafia 3" and performance for Chinese Room's "Everybody's Gone to the Rapture". "Rapture" won Best Performance BAFTA for Merle Dandridge. In 2014, "Alien: Isolation" was released by Creative Assembly, to great acclaim. Saxon was Performance Director on the game, which won a BAFTA and was a recipient of 6 Bafta Nominations. Saxon is the Lead Performance Director of "Witcher III". She was Lead Performance Director for motion capture and voice for Far Cry 3 MP, Fable: Journey and Bond: Bloodstone. Also Voice Director for Castlevania: Lords of Shadow for which she directed an all-star cast including Patrick Stewart, Robert Carlyle and Jason Issacs; Bond: Goldeneye 007 reloaded and Witcher II. Witcher II won over 60 awards globally including a number for best character and best voice acting. Prior to this, Voice Director for popular MMO Age of Conan: Hyborian Adventures (FUNCOM). For Heavenly Sword (Ninja Theory), Saxon directed all the lead level and AI dialogue and was Lead voice director on BAFTA winner Fable II (Lionhead) which also won the Develop Award for Audio Accomplishment in 2009. For Fable III Saxon directed a cast of over 80 actors, including Ben Kingsley, Michael Fassbender, Simon Pegg, Naomie Harris and John Cleese. Saxon provided MoCap and voiceover direction for Killzone 2 (Sony). She also directed Dragon Quest: Journey of the Cursed King, and for Star Wars: The Force Unleashed (LucasArts) she cast European roles.

Television
Saxon has directed 2 episodes of "Silent Witness" and 3 episodes of "Endeavour".
Saxon directed episodes 2 and 3 for "Call The Midwife" series 8, which aired in 2019.
She has directed "Casualty" "Eastenders" and "Doctors".
In 2013, Saxon trained in multi-cam directing on the set of EastEnders and went on to direct several episodes, as well as the BBC Red Button episode "T & B 4 Eva".

References

Living people
British theatre directors
British television directors
British casting directors
Women casting directors
British voice directors
Year of birth missing (living people)